Marshall–White syndrome is a skin condition that consists of Bier spots associated with insomnia and tachycardia.

See also 
 Skin lesion

References 

Vascular-related cutaneous conditions
Syndromes affecting the skin